Stewarton is a rural locality in the Central Highlands Region, Queensland, Australia. In the  Stewarton had a population of 39 people.

Geography
Two railway lines in the Blackwater railway system enters the locality from the north with the first exiting to the west and the second terminating in the centre of the locality. The locality is served by a number of railway stations. On the first line are:

 Tikardi railway station
Boorgoon Junction railway station
Boorgoon railway station

 Kinrola railway station
On the second line are:

Taurus railway station
Koorilgah railway station

History 
In the  Stewarton had a population of 39 people.

References 

Central Highlands Region
Localities in Queensland